Amy Phillips may refer to:

Amy Phillips (cyclist) (born 1973), American racing cyclist
Amy Phillips (actress) (born 1978), British actress
Aimee Phillips (born 1991), New Zealand footballer